The Minghetti II government of Italy held office from 10 July 1873 until 25 March 1876, a total of 989 days, or 2 year, 8 months and 15 days.

Government parties
The government was composed by the following parties:

Composition

References

Italian governments
1873 establishments in Italy